Lese is a Central Sudanic language of northeastern Democratic Republic of the Congo, as well as a name for the people who speak this language. The Lese people, live in association with the Efé Pygmies and share their language, which is occasionally known as Lissi or Efe.

Although Efe is given a separate ISO code, Bahuchet (2006) notes that it is not even a distinct dialect, though there is dialectical variation in the language of the Lese (Dese, Karo).

Lese is spoken in Mambasa Territory, Watsa Territory, and Irumu Territory.

Phonology

Consonants 

 Lese can also have a doubly articulated [q͡p].
 /r/ can also be heard as a tap sound [ɾ].

Vowels 

 In rare cases, /ɛ/ can be heard in phonological opposition as a rounded [œ].

References

Bahuchet, Serge. 2006. "Languages of the African Rainforest « Pygmy » Hunter-Gatherers: Language Shifts without Cultural Admixture." In Historical linguistics and hunter-gatherers populations in global perspective. Leipzig.

African Pygmies
Central Sudanic languages
Languages of the Democratic Republic of the Congo